Géraldine Muhlmann is a French political scientist and political journalist. She is a former host of the France 5 program C politique (Fr).

Education and positions
Muhlmann received the 1er accessit in the  philosophy concours général in 1989.

Muhlmann attended the École normale supérieure in Paris, earning an Agrégation in philosophy in 1994 and one in political science in 2003, and a doctorate in political science in 2001. She also studied public service at the Sciences Po, in the class of 1995. In 1996, Muhlmann obtained a graduate degree in journalism from New York University.

Career
In 1995, Muhlmann participated in the electoral campaign of Lionel Jospin in the 1995 French presidential election. In 1996, after graduating with a degree in journalism, Muhlmann began working with the American journalist Charlie Rose on the television channel PBS. Muhlmann then became an instructor at the University of Paris II Panthéon-Assas in the Center for the study of administrative science (Fr), and also at Paris-Sud University.

From 1998 to 1999, Muhlmann was a project manager in the office of Martine Aubry, who at the time was France's Minister of Labour. Muhlmann continued to work as a political commentator, with regular appearances on radio and television shows including On refait le monde (fr) on RTL, Frédéric Ferney's Le Bateau livre (fr) on France 5, Le Rendez-vous des Politiques on France Culture, and Les Matins de France Culture. In 2008 she was a host on Paris Première, including the talk show Cactus produced by Emmanuel Chain (fr).

In 2011, Muhlmann replaced Nicolas Demorand on the France 5 politics program C politique, when Demorand was hired to manage the newspaper Libération. She remained there until 2012.

In 2014, Muhlmann joined Franz-Olivier Giesbert on Les Grandes Questions on France 5. Muhlmann has also been one of the main presenters on the France 2 news show On n'est pas couché.

Works
Une histoire politique du journalisme, XIXe-XXe siècles (2004) 
Du journalisme en démocratie (2004) 
Political History of Journalism (2008) 
Histoire des idées politiques (2011)

References

Living people
Year of birth missing (living people)
French political scientists
20th-century French women writers
21st-century French women writers
20th-century French non-fiction writers
21st-century French non-fiction writers
French women non-fiction writers
Women political scientists
New York University alumni